Darryl Stephens is an American actor and author. He is best known for playing Noah Nicholson on the television dramedy Noah's Arc.

Film career
Back in L.A., Stephens appeared on the sexy late-night serial MTV's Undressed, the short-lived series That's Life, and VH1's Red Eye. During the same period, he was also appearing in various commercials for products such as Dockers and performing in small theater venues and scene study classes. He also played a "future funked" Greta in a Hollywood revival of the well-known play Bent.

Stephens had supporting roles in the films Seamless (with Shannon Elizabeth), Not Quite Right, and Circuit. However, his breakout role came in 2004, when independent filmmaker Patrik-Ian Polk cast him as the lead character for the new series Noah's Arc. The original intention was for the show to be released direct-to-DVD after it had received rave reviews at various film festivals. However, in the fall of 2005, LOGO picked up Noah's Arc, which debuted on October 19.

In August 2006 the second season of Noah's Arc was televised. By the end of 2006, Stephens had completed roles in the comedy Another Gay Movie and the drama Boy Culture, the latter alongside newcomer Derek Magyar.

In October 2008, a feature film version was release. Noah's Arc: Jumping the Broom picks up where the show's second season left off and tells the story of the marriage between Stephens' character and Jensen Atwood's.

In 2010, he guest starred in an episode of Private Practice, playing a transgender woman. His next film, released in 2011, was Bolden!, a bio film about jazz great Buddy Bolden starring Anthony Mackie as Bolden. Stephens' role is of cornet player Frank Lewis.

Stephens played the recurring role Gideon on B Positive on CBS.

Other
Stephens released a self-published novel in 2011, entitled Shortcomings, which weaves together short stories he had written previously.

Personal life
Although Stephens is reluctant to discuss his personal life, he is gay and his roles address issues of classism and sexuality. In 2020, he became a father.

Filmography

Awards and nominations
Ovation Awards
2011: Nominated for Featured Actor in a Play for the role of Victoria in the Bootleg Theatre production of "The Interlopers"

Notes 
http://www.thebody.com/content/80676/making-black-gay-lives-matter-a-conversation-with-.html

http://www.thebody.com/content/80679/untying-tongues-a-conversation-with-darryl-stephen.html

References

External links

 

1974 births
20th-century American male actors
21st-century American male actors
African-American male actors
American male television actors
American gay actors
LGBT African Americans
Living people
Male actors from Pasadena, California
LGBT people from California
20th-century African-American people
21st-century African-American people
21st-century American LGBT people